Ginásio Clube Alcobaça is a Portuguese sports club from Alcobaça.

The club was founded in 1946. In the 2018/19 season, the senior football section plays in the tier 1 of the Leiria Football Association.

Appearances
Primeira Divisão: 1
Segunda Divisão: 14
Terceira Divisão: 34

League history
The club has a single presence at the top level of Portuguese football, during the 1982–83 season.

Honours
AF Leiria First Division
1946-47, 1950–51, 1953–54, 1955–56, 1957–58, 1958–59, 1971–72, 1992–93, 1995–96, 2000–01, 2010–11
AF Leiria Cup
2004-05

Greatest Performances
Primeira Liga: 16th (1982–83 season)
Portuguese Cup: 1/2 (1981–82 season)

Current squad

References

External links

Football clubs in Portugal
Association football clubs established in 1946
Sport in Leiria
1946 establishments in Portugal
Primeira Liga clubs